Amer Mushraf  (born 1 July 1975) is a former Iraqi football forward who played for Iraq in the 2002 FIFA World Cup qualification. He played for the national team between 1995 and 2001. 

On 23 April 2001, Amer scored his first goal against Nepal.

International career

International goals
Scores and results list Iraq's goal tally first.

References

Iraqi footballers
Iraq international footballers
Al-Shorta SC players
Living people
1975 births
Association football forwards